Mars Hill is an unincorporated community in Cobb County, in the U.S. state of Georgia.

Mars Hill Road is a primary corridor through the area and neighboring Lost Mountain. Residents in the community have either Acworth, Marietta,  or Powder Springs addresses.

History
Mars Hill was named after a local church, which in turn was named after Mars Hill (Areopagus) in Classical Athens.

References

Unincorporated communities in Cobb County, Georgia